There are at least 74 named trails in Gallatin County, Montana according to the U.S. Geological Survey, Board of Geographic Names.  A trail is defined as: "Route for passage from one point to another; does not include roads or highways (jeep trail, path, ski trail)."

 Alpine Access Ski Trail, el.  
 Alpine Face Ski Trail, el.  
 Alpine Run Ski Trail, el.  
 Avalanche Gulch Ski Trail, el.  
 Bangtail Trail, el.  
 Bitterroot Ski Trail, el.  
 Bobcat Ski Trail, el.  
 Boot Hill Ski Trail, el.  
 Bridger Run Ski Trail, el.  
 Bronco Ski Trail, el.  
 Brush Run Ski Trail, el.  
 Bucks Run Ski Trail, el.  
 Cabin Creek Divide Trail, el.  
 Chalet Road Ski Trail, el.  
 Colters Ski Trail, el.  
 Coyote Flats Ski Trail, el.  
 Deer Park Face Ski Trail, el.  
 Deer Park Road Ski Trail, el.  
 Devils Dive Ski Trail, el.  

 Divide Trail, el.  
 Easy Money Ski Trail, el.  
 Eldridge Trail, el.  
 Emigrant Ski Trail, el.  
 Emils Mile Ski Trail, el.  
 Exit Chute Ski Trail, el.  
 Fawn Pass Trail, el.  
 Flippers Ski Trail, el.  
 Freedom Ski Trail, el.  
 Hantons Hollow Ski Trail, el.  
 High Traverse Ski Trail, el.  
 Kirkwood Trail, el.  
 Last Chance Ski Trail, el.  
 Limestone Ski Trail, el.  

 Little Tepee Creek Trail, el.  
 Little Wapiti Creek Trail, el.  
 Lower Limestone Ski Trail, el.  
 Maverick Ski Trail, el.  
 Missouri Breaks Ski Trail, el.  
 Mogul Mouse Ski Trail, el.  
 Moose Meadows Ski Trail, el.  
 Mully Road Ski Trail, el.  
 North Bowl Road Ski Trail, el.  
 North Bowl Run Ski Trail, el.  
 North Meadows Road Ski Trail, el.  
 Pierres Return Ski Trail, el.  
 Pierres Road Ski Trail, el.  
 Porcupine Ski Trail, el.  
 Powder Hog Ski Trail, el.  
 Powder Horn Ski Trail, el.  
 Powder Park Ski Trail, el.  
 Powder Puff Ski Trail, el.  
 Ptarmigan Ski Trail, el.  
 Rays Road, el.  

 Red Rock Trail, el.  
 Sacajawea Ski Trail, el.  
 Sawmill Gulch Ski Trail, el.  
 Skyline Trail, el.  

 Sluice Box Ski Trail, el.  
 South Boundary Ski Trail, el.  
 South Fork Trail, el.  
 Stock Drive Trail, el.  
 Summer Road Ski Trail, el.  
 Sunnyside Ski Trail, el.  
 The John Ski Trail, el.  
 The Nose Ski Trail, el.  
 Three Bears Bowl Ski Trail, el.  
 Three Bears Traverse Ski Trail, el.  
 Thunder Road Ski Trail, el.  
 Tight Squeeze Ski Trail, el.  
 Wapiti Creek Trail, el.  
 Wapiti Ridge Trail, el.  
 White Lightning Ski Trail, el.  
 Wolverine Ski Trail, el.  
 Zits Ski Trail, el.

Further reading

See also
 List of trails of Montana
 Trails of Yellowstone National Park

Notes

Geography of Gallatin County, Montana
 Gallatin County
Transportation in Gallatin County, Montana